Kuzhandai Ullam is a 1969 Indian Tamil-language drama film directed, produced and written by Savitri. The film stars Gemini Ganesan, Sowcar Janaki and Vanisri. A remake of Savitri's Telugu film Chinnari Papalu (1968), it was released on 14 January 1969 and became an average success.

Plot 

A rich painter meets a tribal girl at a forest and falls in love with her. He finds himself married to her without knowing it, spends a night with her blissfully and then is forced into marrying a city girl to satisfy his mother. His emotional involvement with the tribal girl, whom he just cannot erase from memory complicates things. Ultimately, thanks to two children, the broken hearts are united.

Cast 
 Gemini Ganesan
 Sowcar Janaki
 Vanisri
 R. S. Manohar
 Thengai Srinivasan
 Rama Prabha
V. K. Ramasamy
A. Veerappan

Production 
Though Savitri's Telugu film Chinnari Papalu (1968) was a box-office bomb, it received critical acclaim; this prompted her to remake it in Tamil as Kuzhandai Ullam. Savitri, in addition to directing, produced it under Sri Savitri Productions, and wrote the screenplay while M. Lakshmanan wrote the dialogues. Singh and Sekhar, the cinematographers of the original, returned in their positions, and editing was handled by M. S. N. Murthy.

Soundtrack 
The soundtrack was composed by S. P. Kodandapani, and the lyrics were written by Kannadasan.

Release and reception 
Kuzhandai Ullam was released on 14 January 1969, during Pongal. The Indian Express wrote on 25 January, "[Savitri] has on the whole weaved a fairly appealing product though old-fashioned in style and treatment." The film was an average success.

References

External links 
 

1960s Tamil-language films
1969 drama films
Films scored by S. P. Kodandapani
Indian drama films
Tamil remakes of Telugu films